Pritinker Diwaker (born 22 November 1961) is an Indian judge. Presently, he is Acting Chief Justice of Allahabad High Court. He is former Judge of Chhattisgarh High Court.

References

 Indian judges
1961 births
Living people
Chief Justices of the Allahabad High Court
Judges of the Allahabad High Court
Judges of the Chhattisgarh High Court